David S. Green was a minister and state legislator in Mississippi.

He represented Grenada County in the Mississippi House of Representatives from 1872 to 1875. He was a minister in the Methodist Episcopal church. In 1912, the Mississippi Historical society described him as a "very black, common, old Negro."

See also
African-American officeholders during and following the Reconstruction era

References

African-American state legislators in Mississippi
Members of the Mississippi House of Representatives
African-American politicians during the Reconstruction Era
Religious leaders from Mississippi
African-American Christian clergy
19th-century American Methodist ministers
African Methodist Episcopal Church clergy
People from Grenada County, Mississippi
Methodists from Mississippi